Quince Ensemble (Sometimes referred to as Quince Contemporary Vocal Ensemble) is a contemporary treble vocal ensemble that specializes in contemporary classical music. In 2010, founding members, Amanda DeBoer Bartlett and Kayleigh Butcher met at a Neko Case concert in Bowling Green, Ohio while attending Bowling Green State University. Focusing on an all-female group, the two assembled a five-member ensemble consisting of McKayela Collins-Hornor, Aubrey von Almen, Liz Pearse, Kayleigh Butcher, and Amanda DeBoer Bartlett within a year. As performance schedules became more demanding, Aubrey and McKayela left the group, and Carrie Henneman Shaw of Ensemble Dal Niente joined the ensemble, resulting in the current quartet roster.

Quince has since performed extensively throughout the United States, performing primarily new music works by 20th and 21st century composers including: David Lang, Morton Feldman, and Steve Reich and most recently, Jennifer Jolley,Evan Williams, Paul Pinto and Kate Soper.

Quince is signed to New Focus Recordings, and has released two albums with them. In July 2017, Quince's Hushers was judged "Critic's Choice" by Opera News and they were named "the Anonymous 4 of new music." They have also collaborated with high-caliber artists and ensembles such as Eighth Blackbird, Third Coast Percussion, Ensemble Dal Niente, and Laurie Anderson.

Discography

Collaborative albums

References

Contemporary classical music ensembles
Vocal ensembles